The 1916 United States presidential election in Mississippi took place on November 7, 1916, as part of the 1916 United States presidential election which was held throughout all contemporary 48 states. Voters chose 10 representatives, or electors to the Electoral College, who voted for president and vice president. In Mississippi, voters voted for electors individually instead of as a slate, as in the other states.

Mississippi was won by the Democratic nominees, incumbent Democratic President Woodrow Wilson and Vice President Thomas R. Marshall. They defeated Republican nominee, U.S. Supreme Court Justice Charles Evans Hughes of New York, and his running mate Senator Charles W. Fairbanks of Indiana. 

Wilson won Mississippi by a landslide margin of 87.87%.

Results

References

Mississippi
1916
1916 Mississippi elections